Segnano is a quarter of Milan, Italy. It is an area located within Zone 9 of the city. The population range from 5,854 in 1975 to 5,278 in 2015 with the males being about 49.8% and the females 50.2%. Segano covers an area of 0.563 km.

References

 https://www.city-facts.com/segnano-milano

Districts of Milan
Former municipalities of Lombardy